Al-Yadudah is a village in southern Syria, administratively part of the Daraa Governorate, located north-west of Daraa. Nearby localities include Tell Shihab to the west, Muzayrib to the northwest, Tafas to the west and Ataman to the east.

History
In  the Ottoman  tax registers of 1596,  it was a village located the nahiya of  Butayna,  Qada of Hawran, under the name of Yaduda. It had  a population of 29 households and 21 bachelors, all Muslims. They paid a fixed tax-rate of 25% on agricultural products, including  wheat, barley, summer crops,  goats and beehives, in addition to occasional revenues; a total of 4,500 akçe.

According to the Syria Central Bureau of Statistics, al-Yadudah had a population of 8,967 in the 2004 census.

Syrian Civil War

On 13 September 2021, residents of the village struck a reconciliation deal with the Syrian Military. Allowing Syrian army and Russian forces to enter the village.

On 11 May 2022, a Syrian soldier of the 4th Armoured Division was shot dead by insurgents in the village.

References

Bibliography

External links
Map of the town, Google Maps
Cheik Meskin-map; 21L

Populated places in Daraa District